Mânjești may refer to:

 Mânjești, a village in Mogoșești Commune, Iași County, Romania
 Mânjești, a village in Muntenii de Jos Commune, Vaslui County, Romania